Jasmine Abrams (born 14 March 1994) is a Guyanese athlete. In January 2020, Abrams set a new national indoor record in the 60 metres. In July 2021, she qualified to represent Guyana at the delayed 2020 Summer Olympics in Tokyo. She finished seventh in her heat in the Athletics at the 2020 Summer Olympics – Women's 100 metres running 11.79 seconds.

Personal life
Abrams was born in New York City to Guyanese parents. Her sister Aliyah Abrams is also an Olympic athlete.

References

External links

1994 births
Living people
Guyanese female sprinters
Olympic athletes of Guyana
Athletes (track and field) at the 2020 Summer Olympics
American sportspeople of Guyanese descent
Track and field athletes from New York City
Olympic female sprinters
Athletes (track and field) at the 2022 Commonwealth Games